Shyamsundarpur  is a village in Chanditala I community development block of Srirampore subdivision in Hooghly district in the Indian state of West Bengal.

Geography

Gram panchayat
Villages in Ainya gram panchayat are: Akuni, Aniya, Bandpur, Banipur, Bara Choughara, Dudhkanra, Ganeshpur, Goplapur, Jiara, Kalyanbati, Mukundapur, Sadpur and Shyamsundarpur.

Demographics
As per 2011 Census of India Shyamsundarpur had a total population of 2,028 of which 1,050 (52%) were males and 978 (48%) were females. Population below 6 years was 216. The total number of literates in Shyamsundarpur was 1,506 (83.11% of the population over 6 years).

Transport
Shyamsundarpur is on Munshirhat-Mosat Road. Bargachia railway station and Baruipara railway station are the nearest railway stations.

References 

Villages in Chanditala I CD Block